Mohamed Rilwan Alowonle (born 12 December 1993) is a US-born athlete specialising in the 400 metres hurdles. He competes internationally for Nigeria, the country of origin of both his parents. He competed at the 2019 World Championships in Doha reaching the semifinals. Earlier that year he finished fourth at the 2019 African Games.

His personal best in the event is 49.42 seconds set in Rabat in 2019.

International competitions

References

External links
 
 North Carolina Tar Heels bio

1993 births
Living people
Nigerian male hurdlers
World Athletics Championships athletes for Nigeria
Athletes (track and field) at the 2018 Commonwealth Games
Athletes (track and field) at the 2019 African Games
People from Cottage Grove, Minnesota
African Games competitors for Nigeria
Commonwealth Games competitors for Nigeria
Track and field athletes from Minnesota
American sportspeople of Nigerian descent
North Carolina Tar Heels men's track and field athletes